Live at the Dome may refer to:

 Live at the Dome (Glen Campbell video), 1991
 Live at the Dome (The Human League concert video), 2004
 Live at the Dome (The Human League album), 2005